Colonel (retired) Peter A.M. Ogar was Military Administrator of Kwara State, Nigeria between August 1996 and August 1998 during the military regime of General Sani Abacha.
After the return to democracy in 1999, Ogar was required to retire, as were all other former military administrators.
When the United Nigeria Development Forum was formed by former military governors in April 2001, Ogar was a member of the steering committee.

Military career
Colonel Peter Asam Mbu Ogar (Col. P.A.M Ogar) lead infantry divisions as part of the ECOMOG peace keeping missions in Liberia. After his successful peace keeping missions in Liberia, he returned to Nigeria where he was commissioned to be the General Officer Commanding (GOC) of Division 1 in Kaduna state.
Upon his completion of his appointment, he was appointed as the military administrator of Kwara state during the military regime of General Sani Abacha.

Educational Background
Col. P.A.M Ogar was commissioned as an officer after attending the Nigerian Defense Academy. He also studied at military institutes in Savannah, Georgia as well as obtained an MBA after his military service from the university of Jos in Plateau State in Nigeria.

References

Nigerian Army officers
Living people
Governors of Kwara State
Year of birth missing (living people)